Operation Swarmer was a joint U.S-Iraqi air assault offensive targeting insurgents in Salahuddin province, near the central city of Samarra, Iraq.

According to the US military, it was the largest air assault in Iraq since the U.S. invasion in 2003. The area was a hotbed for insurgent activity including the kidnapping and killing of civilians and soldiers. Samarra was the site of the bombing of the revered Al-Askari Shiite Shrine on 22 February 2006, that set off a wave of sectarian killing that claimed almost 500 lives. Coalition forces said they had captured a number of weapons caches containing shells, explosives and military uniforms. The US military expected this operation to last several days. Iraqi Foreign Minister Hoshyar Zebari stated that insurgents were "trying to create another Fallujah". The Operation netted at least 48 suspects, of which about 17 were released. The U.S Military reports no significant resistance, and also says it achieved the tactical surprise factor it was seeking.

Other reports, however, have suggested that the lack of resistance may have been due to a lack of significant targets in the region. Time magazine's Brian Bennett reported that the area is a farming community with only 1,500 residents. Time also contested early television news reports that the operation was the largest use of air power since the 2003 invasion of Iraq, indicating that no air strikes had occurred. Bennett points out that the military term air assault refers specifically to moving troops into an area. Reporter Christopher Allbritton further reports that no fixed-wing aircraft were involved in the operation. However, the lack of fixed-wing aircraft and the use of airstrikes does not mean that the mission was not, by definition, an air assault.

See also

2003 invasion of Iraq.
Sectarian violence in Iraq.
Al Askari Mosque bombing.

References

External links

American Forces Press Service: Iraqi Security Forces, Coalition Launch "Operation Swarmer"
BBC News article US launches major Iraq air attack
U.S., Iraqis Launch 'Operation Swarmer'
U.S., Iraqis launch raid on insurgent hotbed
'Operation Swarmer' Air Assault Launched in Iraq
 How US assault grabbed global attention
Brian Bennett webpage
 Christopher Allbritton webpage

Military operations of the Iraq War involving the United States
Military operations of the Iraq War involving Iraq
Military operations of the Iraq War in 2006
Iraqi insurgency (2003–2011)